Luo Xiaomin (born 14 November 1999) is a Chinese weightlifter competing in the 59 kg division.

She currently holds the junior world record in the snatch.

Career
She competed at the 5th International Qatar Cup in the 59 kg category winning the silver medal in the total behind Kuo Hsing-chun.

She won the gold medal in the women's 59kg Snatch event at the 2022 World Weightlifting Championships held in Bogotá, Colombia.

Major results

References

1999 births
Living people
Chinese female weightlifters
21st-century Chinese women